The 2019–20 NCAA Division I men's basketball season began on November 5, 2019. The first tournament was the 2K Sports Classic and the season concluded prematurely on March 12, 2020. The 2020 NCAA Division I men's basketball tournament was scheduled to end in Atlanta on April 6, 2020, but was ultimately canceled. All other postseason tournaments were canceled as well. Practices officially began in late September.

On March 12, 2020, the NCAA announced that all remaining winter and spring championships for both men's and women's sports were canceled due to the COVID-19 pandemic. It was the first cancellation in the history of the NCAA Division I men's basketball tournament. The NCAA did not name an official national champion after the tournament was canceled. 

Kansas finished first in both major polls but has yet to claim a national championship for the season.

Rule changes
On June 5, 2019, the NCAA announced that its Playing Rules Oversight Panel had approved a suite of rules changes that its Men's Basketball Rules Committee had recommended the previous month. These changes took effect in 2019–20 for all NCAA divisions, with one exception.
The NCAA published diagrams on June 17, 2019 reflecting the new three-point line, including its distance from the sidelines near the corners of the court. This change took immediate effect in Division I, but was delayed to 2020–21 for Divisions II and III.
 On offensive rebounds in the frontcourt, the shot clock is now reset to 20 seconds instead of the full 30.
 Any derogatory on-court comments regarding a player's race, ethnicity, religion, gender, sexual orientation or disability result in a flagrant-2 technical foul and automatic ejection.
 Two new rules apply during the last two minutes of regulation and the last two minutes of any overtime period:
 Coaches are allowed to call live-ball timeouts. Previously, coaches were prohibited from calling live-ball timeouts at any time.
 The list of calls that can be reviewed via instant replay expanded to include basket interference and goaltending.

Season headlines
 May 9, 2019 – The NCAA announced its Academic Progress Rate (APR) sanctions for the 2019–20 school year. A total of nine programs in eight sports were declared ineligible for postseason play due to failure to meet the required APR benchmark, including the following Division I men's basketball team:
Detroit Mercy
 June 3, 2019 – The Sun Belt Conference, which a year earlier had announced a series of radical changes in its men's basketball scheduling format that would have taken effect with the 2019–20 season, announced that it had placed those changes on hold. The Sun Belt will proceed with one element of the plan, namely an expansion of the conference schedule to 20 games. In its announcement, the conference noted that the original plan had been based on data related to the RPI, an NCAA tournament selection metric that had been replaced by the significantly different NET effective with the 2019 tournament.
 June 18 – The ASUN Conference officially announced that Bellarmine University, currently a member of the NCAA Division II Great Lakes Valley Conference, would move to Division I and join the ASUN effective with the 2020–21 school year.
 June 20 – The Summit League announced that the University of Missouri–Kansas City would return to the conference on July 1, 2020 after seven years in the Western Athletic Conference.
 June 21 – The Boston-area sports news website Digital Sports Desk reported that the University of Connecticut (UConn) was expected to announce by the end of the month that it would leave the American Athletic Conference to rejoin many of its former conference mates in the Big East Conference in 2020. The story was picked up by multiple national media outlets the next day.
 June 27 – The Big East and UConn jointly announced that the school would join the Big East; though the official announcements did not specify a time, it was expected that the Huskies would become members in 2020.
 July 15 – Binghamton rising sophomore forward Calistus Anyichie drowned in an incident at Buttermilk Falls State Park near Ithaca, New York. The incident was being investigated as an accident.
 July 26 – Multiple media reports indicated that UConn and The American had reached a buyout agreement that will lead to UConn joining the Big East in July 2020. The exit fee was reportedly $17 million.
 August 5
 The NCAA issued a set of rules that outlined new certification requirements for agents who sought to represent college underclassmen who declare themselves eligible for the NBA draft but wish to maintain college eligibility while evaluating their draft prospects. The new requirements were that the agents hold a bachelor's degree; have been certified by the NBA players' union, the National Basketball Players Association (NBPA), for at least three years; hold professional liability insurance; and pass an in-person exam administered each November at the NCAA headquarters in Indianapolis. The bachelor's degree requirement was immediately dubbed the "Rich Paul Rule", as it was widely viewed as preventing Paul, who represents LeBron James, Anthony Davis, Ben Simmons, and Draymond Green, among others, from representing underclassmen because he does not have a bachelor's degree.
 The Horizon League announced that Purdue University Fort Wayne would leave the Summit League to join the Horizon League in July 2020.
 August 12 – After widespread criticism by media and NBA players, the NCAA amended the so-called "Rich Paul Rule" regarding agent certification. Agents such as Paul who do not hold bachelor's degrees but meet all other NCAA requirements will be allowed to represent underclassmen if they are in good standing with the NBPA.
 September 30
 California governor Gavin Newsom signed the Fair Pay to Play Act into law, which upon taking effect in 2023 will prohibit public colleges and universities in the state from punishing their athletes for earning endorsement income. The bill places the state in direct conflict with the NCAA's current business model, which prohibits college athletes from receiving such income. At the time the bill was signed, several other states were proposing similar laws.
 A group of Louisville Cardinals players who were not involved in the NCAA rules violations that caused the team to be stripped of its 2013 national title and 2012 Final Four appearance reached a confidential settlement of a lawsuit against the NCAA. One portion of the settlement was authorized to be revealed—while Louisville's team records remained vacated, all honors and statistics for these players were restored. Most notably, Luke Hancock, who was a plaintiff in the suit, was once again officially recognized as the Most Outstanding Player of the 2013 Final Four.
 Officials at Tarleton State University, current members of the Division II Lone Star Conference, announced that the school had accepted an invitation to join the Western Athletic Conference. Full details, including the joining date, were expected to be revealed in the following days, but were delayed by more than a month.
 October 4 – Officials at the University of St. Thomas, a Minnesota school that will be expelled from its longtime athletic home of the NCAA Division III Minnesota Intercollegiate Athletic Conference (MIAC) in 2021, announced that the school had received an invitation to join the Summit League upon its MIAC departure. In order for St. Thomas to directly transition to the Summit, it must receive a waiver of an NCAA rule stating that Division III schools can only transition to Division II.
 October 22 – The Associated Press preseason All-American team was released. Michigan State guard Cassius Winston was the lone unanimous selection (65 votes). Joining him on the team were Marquette guard Markus Howard (57 votes), Louisville forward Jordan Nwora (47), Seton Hall guard Myles Powell (46), and Memphis center James Wiseman (32).
 October 29 – The NCAA board of governors voted unanimously to begin the process of changing institutional rules so that college athletes can profit from their names, images, and likenesses, while still maintaining a distinction between college and professional sports. The proposal calls for each of the three NCAA divisions to draft new rules consistent with this mandate, with a target date of January 2021.
 November 8 – The NCAA ruled incoming Memphis freshman star and preseason All-American James Wiseman ineligible because his family had received moving expenses from current head coach Penny Hardaway in 2017, a year before Hardaway was hired by the school. Despite his not having been employed by Memphis at the time, the NCAA considered Hardaway to be a Memphis booster because the former NBA star had donated large amounts to the school's athletic program more than a decade earlier. Memphis and Wiseman received an injunction to halt the NCAA's ruling from a local judge, and Wiseman played in the Tigers' season opener later that day.
 November 12 – The Western Athletic Conference officially announced Tarleton State's entry into the league effective July 1, 2020.
 November 14 – In the next major development in the Wiseman story, he dropped his lawsuit against the NCAA, and Memphis declared him ineligible and withdrew him from play. The school also announced it would seek reinstatement from the NCAA.
 January 21 – The Kansas State–Kansas game was marred by a bench-clearing brawl. In the final seconds of a game that Kansas would win 81–60, State's DaJuan Gordon went up for a layup that was blocked by Kansas' Silvio De Sousa. After the block, De Sousa stood over Gordon, leading to an altercation that escalated into a bench-clearing melee. During the brawl, De Sousa and several other players threw punches, and De Sousa held a chair above his head until it was taken from him by a Kansas assistant. Kansas did not wait for the Big 12 Conference to take action, announcing the next day that De Sousa would be suspended indefinitely, pending the Big 12 review of the incident.
 January 22 – The Big 12 issued suspensions for four players involved in the previous night's Kansas State–Kansas brawl. De Sousa drew the longest suspension at 12 games. Kansas teammate David McCormack was suspended for 2 games, while Kansas State's James Love and Antonio Gordon were respectively banned for 8 and 3 games.
 February 7 – The Big South Conference officially announced that North Carolina A&T State University would leave its longtime home of the Mid-Eastern Athletic Conference for the Big South effective with the 2021–22 school year.
 February 18 – The NCAA announced that it was considering a proposal that would allow student-athletes in all sports a one-time waiver to transfer to a new school without having to sit out a season. This would place all NCAA sports under the same transfer rules; currently, first-time transfers are only required to sit out a season in baseball, men's and women's basketball, football, and men's ice hockey. The existing criteria for the waiver would be extended to these five sports—namely, a player must receive a transfer release from his or her previous school, leave that school academically eligible, maintain academic progress at the new school, and not be under any disciplinary suspension.
 Responses to the COVID-19 pandemic:
 March 10
 The Big West Conference announced that its men's and women's conference tournaments, with women's play starting on March 10 at Walter Pyramid at California State University, Long Beach and men's play starting on March 12 at the Honda Center in Anaheim, California, would be closed to spectators.
 The Ivy League canceled its 2020 men's and women's conference tournaments, both originally scheduled for March 14 and 15 at the Lavietes Pavilion on the campus of Harvard University. Regular-season champion Yale was named the Ivy League's automatic qualifier for the NCAA men's tournament.
 The Mid-American Conference did not initially cancel its men's and women's tournaments, which had begun on March 9 with first-round games at campus sites, but announced that the remainder of both tournaments, to be held at Rocket Mortgage FieldHouse in Cleveland from March 11–14, would be held under what it called a "restricted attendance policy". The only individuals allowed to attend games will be credentialed institutional personnel, credentialed media and broadcast crews, team party members, and family members of players. The conference would later cancel its tournament on March 12 (see below).
 March 11
The NCAA announced that both the men's and women's entire NCAA Tournaments would be conducted with "only essential staff and limited family attendance"
 The Gazelle Group, organizer of the College Basketball Invitational, canceled the 2020 CBI. The company stated that it intends to resume the event in 2021.
 March 12
 All Division I conference tournaments that had yet to be completed were canceled, even those in progress.
 Some schools—most notably Duke and Kansas—suspended all athletic travel indefinitely. Both the Blue Devils and the presumptive top overall seed Jayhawks had been expected to decline NCAA tournament bids before the cancellation of the tournament.
The NCAA announced that all remaining winter and spring championships would be canceled for both men's and women's sports in all divisions. It is the first cancellation in the history of the NCAA Division I men's basketball tournament.
 March 13
The Florida Senate passed a resolution declaring Florida State national champions for the 2019–2020 season. The resolution, introduced by Republican Joe Gruters, passed by a vote of 37–2.
 March 16
Prior to 1939, when the NCAA organised its first tournament, mythical national champions were named later by NCAA-recognised research of the Helms Athletic Foundation that schools have claimed as national champions.  In college football, especially in the pre-1998 era when the Bowl Championship Series era began, teams that finished first in final polls were often declared mythical national championship was declared, and the NCAA lists in that sport the teams ranked as the best by various selectors.  Kansas finishes first in the final Coaches Poll standings.   
 March 18
 Kansas finishes first in the final AP Poll, the other major wire service poll that in college football was declared a selector for the national championship.

Milestones and records
 During the season, the following players reached the 2,000 career point milestone – Hampton guard Jermaine Marrow, Marquette guard Markus Howard, College of Charleston guard Grant Riller, Howard swingman Charles Williams, Seton Hall guard Myles Powell, Oregon State forward Tres Tinkle, Weber State guard Jerrick Harding, VCU guard Marcus Evans, Northern Illinois guard Eugene German, Penn State forward Lamar Stevens, William & Mary forward-center Nathan Knight, Utah State guard Sam Merrill, Texas State guard Nijal Pearson, American guard Sa‘eed Nelson, LIU swingman Raiquan Clark, BYU forward Yoeli Childs, Saint Francis (PA) guard Keith Braxton, and UTSA guard Jhivvan Jackson.

 Childs and Braxton also joined the 2,000 point and 1,000 rebound club. Childs was the first in his program's history to do so while Braxton became the first from the Northeast Conference.
 November 5 – Colorado State center Nico Carvacho became the Mountain West Conference all-time leading rebounder, grabbing 11 in a win over Denver. He surpassed Jordan Caroline’s 958 career mark.
 November 8 – Utah defeated Mississippi Valley State 143–49 to set an NCAA record for largest margin of victory (94 points) over a Division I opponent.
 December 1 – Cameron Parker of Sacred Heart had 24 assists in the Pioneers' 101–57 win over NCAA Division III school Pine Manor, setting a new record for single-game assists by a Division I men's player.  He also became the first player in at least the past 20 seasons to record 20 or more assists in a game while failing to score. The previous D-I record of 22 assists had been accomplished four times, most recently by Trae Young of Oklahoma in 2017.
 January 17 – Michigan State’s Cassius Winston became the Big Ten’s all-time assist leader, passing fellow Spartan Mateen Cleaves’ career mark of 816 in a win over Wisconsin.
 February 4 — Boise State's Justinian Jessup broke the Mountain West Conference record for career three-pointers when he passed BYU's Jimmer Fredette's mark of 296.
 February 8 — Quinton Rose of Temple scored 25 points in an overtime win over SMU, becoming the all-time leading scorer for the American Athletic Conference. He passed Rob Gray of Houston’s mark of 1,710 career points, set in 2018.
 February 13 — Markus Howard of Marquette became the Big East’s all-time leading scorer, passing Lawrence Moten of Syracuse’s mark of 1,405 points in conference play. On February 23, Howard also became the Big East's all-time leading scorer in all games, surpassing the 2,632 points of Troy Bell of Boston College.
 February 27 – Merrimack defeated Central Connecticut 69–58 to clinch at least a share of the Northeast Conference regular-season title. The Warriors became the first men's basketball team to record a 20-win season in its first Division I season. Due to NCAA rules for schools transitioning to D-I, the Warriors are ineligible to play in NCAA-sponsored postseason events (the NCAA Tournament and the NIT), and under NEC rules are ineligible for the conference tournament. Two days later, Robert Morris' 78–68 win over Saint Francis (PA) gave the Warriors the outright regular-season NEC title, making them the first men's basketball program to win an outright conference title in its first D-I season. Contrary to an Associated Press report, the Warriors are eligible for non-NCAA postseason events.
 March 2 – McNeese State's Dru Kuxhausen broke the Southland Conference and McNeese records for the most three-pointers made in a single season (120)

Conference membership changes
Two schools joined new conferences for the 2019–20 season. Both moved between Division I and Division II, with one joining Division I and the other leaving Division I.

In addition, two existing Division I teams assumed new athletic identities.

After the 2018–19 school year, Long Island University (LIU) merged the athletic programs of its two main campuses—the Division I LIU Brooklyn Blackbirds and Division II LIU Post Pioneers—into a single program that now plays as the LIU Sharks. The Sharks inherited the Division I and Northeast Conference memberships of the Brooklyn campus, with some sports to be based in Brooklyn and others at the Post campus in Brookville, New York. Specific to basketball, LIU announced that the unified men's and women's teams in that sport would be based in Brooklyn.

On July 1, 2019, the University of Missouri–Kansas City (UMKC) announced that its athletic program, formerly known as the UMKC Kangaroos, would officially become the Kansas City Roos, with "Roos" having long been used as a short form of the former "Kangaroos" nickname.

Arenas

New arenas
Robert Morris moved into the new UPMC Events Center after playing last season at the Student Recreation and Fitness Center, a facility at the school's North Athletic Complex. The Colonials played their first game there on November 12, 2019 however the Colonials lost their first game in the new arena losing to crosstown rival Pitt 71–57.

Arenas closing
 James Madison played its final season at the JMU Convocation Center, home to the Dukes since 1982. The final game at the arena was a women's game on February 29 in which the Dukes defeated Delaware 69–64. JMU opened Atlantic Union Bank Center for the 2020–21 season.
 This was Liberty's final season playing games full-time at the Vines Center, home to the Flames since 1990. The school opened the adjoining Liberty Arena, with less than half of the capacity at Vines Center, for the 2020–21 season. The Vines Center will continue to be used for games in which attendance is expected to exceed 4,000.
 This was intended to be High Point's final season at the Millis Athletic Convocation Center, home to the Panthers since 1992. They planned to open the new Nido Quebin Arena and Conference Center for the 2020–21 season. However, construction delays brought on by COVID-19 led High Point to delay the new arena's opening until 2021–22.

Temporary arenas
 Immediately after the 2018–19 season, Duquesne began an extensive renovation of the on-campus Palumbo Center. When the venue reopens, expected for the 2020–21 school year, it will be renamed UPMC Cooper Fieldhouse, via a partnership between the University of Pittsburgh Medical Center and the family foundation of late Duquesne star Chuck Cooper, the first African American selected in an NBA draft. At the time of announcement, the final capacity of the renovated venue had not been determined, but Duquesne's athletic director expected it to have about the same capacity as the pre-renovation Palumbo Center (4,390). Duquesne split its home games between three venues in 2019–20: PPG Paints Arena, La Roche University's Kerr Fitness Center, and Robert Morris University's new UPMC Events Center.

Season outlook

Pre-season polls

The top 25 from the AP and USA Today Coaches Polls.

Regular season

Early season tournaments

Upsets
An upset is a victory by an underdog team. In the context of NCAA Division I Men's Basketball this generally constitutes an unranked team defeating a team currently ranked In the Top 25. This list will highlight those upsets of ranked teams by unranked teams as well as upsets of #1 teams. Rankings are from the AP poll.

Bold type indicates winning teams in "true road games"-i.e., those played on an opponent's home court (including secondary homes, such as Intrust Bank Arena for Wichita State).

In addition to the above listed upsets in which an unranked team defeated a ranked team, there were six non-Division I teams to defeat a Division I team this season. Bold type indicates winning teams in "true road games"—i.e., those played on an opponent's home court (including secondary homes).

Conference winners and tournaments
Each of the 32 Division I athletic conferences ends its regular season with a single-elimination tournament. The team with the best regular-season record in each conference is given the number one seed in each tournament, with tiebreakers used as needed in the case of ties for the top seeding. The winners of these tournaments receive automatic invitations to the 2020 NCAA Division I men's basketball tournament.

Statistical leaders

Postseason

All post-season tournaments were cancelled prior to completing the qualification process.

Conference standings

Award winners

2020 Consensus All-America team

Major player of the year awards
Wooden Award: Obi Toppin, Dayton
Naismith Award: Obi Toppin, Dayton
Associated Press Player of the Year: Obi Toppin, Dayton
NABC Player of the Year: Obi Toppin, Dayton
Oscar Robertson Trophy (USBWA): Obi Toppin, Dayton
Sporting News Player of the Year: Luka Garza, Iowa

Major freshman of the year awards
Wayman Tisdale Award (USBWA): Vernon Carey Jr., Duke
 NABC Freshman of the Year: Vernon Carey Jr., Duke

Major coach of the year awards
Associated Press Coach of the Year: Anthony Grant, Dayton
Henry Iba Award (USBWA): Anthony Grant, Dayton
NABC Coach of the Year: Anthony Grant, Dayton
Naismith College Coach of the Year: Anthony Grant, Dayton
 Sporting News Coach of the Year: Anthony Grant, Dayton

Other major awards
 Naismith Starting Five:
 Bob Cousy Award (Best point guard): Payton Pritchard, Oregon
 Jerry West Award (Best shooting guard): Myles Powell, Seton Hall
 Julius Erving Award (Best small forward): Saddiq Bey, Villanova
 Karl Malone Award (Best power forward): Obi Toppin, Dayton
 Kareem Abdul-Jabbar Award (Best center): Luka Garza, Iowa
Pete Newell Big Man Award (Best big man): Luka Garza, Iowa
NABC Defensive Player of the Year: Udoka Azubuike, Kansas
 Naismith Defensive Player of the Year: Marcus Garrett, Kansas
Senior CLASS Award (top senior on and off the court): Markus Howard, Marquette
Robert V. Geasey Trophy (Top player in Philadelphia Big 5): Saddiq Bey, Villanova
Haggerty Award (Top player in New York City metro area): Myles Powell, Seton Hall
Ben Jobe Award (Top minority coach): Damon Stoudamire, Pacific
Hugh Durham Award (Top mid-major coach): Steve Forbes, East Tennessee State
Jim Phelan Award (Top head coach): Steve Pikiell, Rutgers
Lefty Driesell Award (Top defensive player): Juvaris Hayes, Merrimack
Lou Henson Award (Top mid-major player): Nathan Knight, William & Mary
Lute Olson Award (Top non-freshman or transfer player): Payton Pritchard, Oregon
Skip Prosser Man of the Year Award (Coach with moral character): Mark Prosser, Western Carolina
Academic All-American of the Year (Top scholar-athlete): Skylar Mays, LSU
Elite 90 Award (Top GPA among upperclass players at Final Four): Not presented due to cancellation of the 2020 NCAA tournament.
USBWA Most Courageous Award: Sam Toney, New Jersey City University (NCAA Division III).

Coaching changes
A number of teams changed coaches during the season and after it ended.

See also
2019–20 NCAA Division I women's basketball season

Notes

References